The One Man Jury (released as The Loner on UK video) is a 1978 American neo-noir film directed by Charles Martin (1910-1983) and starring Jack Palance, Christopher Mitchum, Pamela Shoop, and Cara Williams.

Plot
Jim Wade (Jack Palance) is a ruthless cop with a bad reputation of being rude to suspects, informants, witnesses, and just about anyone who crosses paths with him in the wrong way. When a mysterious serial killer named the Slasher starts killing women, Wade vows to end the killing spree by any means possible, whether legal or not.

Cast
Jack Palance as Lieutenant Wade
Christopher Mitchum as Sergeant Blake
Pamela Shoop as Wendy Sommerset
Cara Williams as Nancy
Joe Spinell as Mike
Jeff McCracken as Billy Joe
Alexandra Hay as Tessie
Angel Tompkins as Kitty
Andy Romano as Chickie
Tom Pedi as Angie
Richard Foronjy as Al
Frank Pesce as Freddie
Dick Yarmy as Customer

References

External links 
 
 
 

1978 films
American neo-noir films
1970s English-language films
Films directed by Charles Martin
1970s American films